This article describes the hotels in London, England.

History
Before the 19th century, there were few, if any, large hotels in London. British country landowners often lived in London for part of the year but they usually rented a house, if the family did not have their own townhouse. The numbers of business and foreign visitors were very small by modern standards, before the Industrial Revolution. The accommodation available to them included gentlemen's club accommodations, lodging houses and coaching inns. Lodging houses were more like private homes with rooms to let than commercial hotels and were often run by widows. Coaching inns served passengers from the stage coaches which were the main means of long-distance passenger transport before railways began to develop in the 1830s. The last surviving galleried coaching inn in London is The George Inn, which now belongs to the National Trust.
 	
A few hotels of a more modern variety began to be built in the early 19th century. For example, Mivart's, the precursor of Claridge's, opened its doors in 1812 but, up to the mid-19th century, London hotels were generally small. In his travel book North America (1862), the novelist Anthony Trollope remarked on how much larger American hotels were than British ones. But, by this time, the railways had already begun to bring far more short-term visitors to London, and the railway companies themselves took the lead in accommodating them by building a series of "railway hotels" near to their London termini. These buildings were seen as status symbols by the railway companies, the largest businesses in the country at the time, and some of them were very grand. They included:

 The Great Western Hotel at Paddington (now the Hilton London Paddington and the first of Britain's railway hotels, built-in 1854)
 The Midland Grand Hotel at St. Pancras (closed from 1935–2011; now the St. Pancras Renaissance London Hotel.)
 The Great Northern Hotel at King's Cross (recently restored as a boutique hotel)
 The Great Eastern Hotel at Liverpool Street (now the Andaz London Liverpool Street)
 The Charing Cross Hotel at Charing Cross station
 The Great Central Hotel at Marylebone (now The Landmark London)
 The Grosvenor House Hotel at Victoria

Many other large hotels were built in London in the Victorian period. The Westminster Palace Hotel (1858), named after its neighbour the Palace of Westminster, i.e. Parliament, was the location of many political meetings. The Langham Hotel was the largest in the city when it opened in 1865.  The Savoy, perhaps London's most famous hotel, opened in 1889, the first London hotel with en-suite bathrooms to every room.  Nine years later Claridge's was rebuilt in its current form.  Another famous hotel, the Ritz, based on its even more celebrated namesake in Paris, opened in 1906.

The upper end of the London hotel business continued to flourish between the two World Wars, boosted by the fact that many landowning families could no longer afford to maintain a London house and therefore began to stay at hotels instead, and by an increasing number of foreign visitors, especially Americans. Famous hotels which opened their doors in this era include the Grosvenor House Hotel and The Dorchester.

The rate of hotel construction in London was fairly low in the quarter-century after World War II and the famous old names retained their dominance of the top end of the market. The most notable hotel of this era was probably the London Hilton, a controversial concrete tower overlooking Hyde Park. Advances in air travel increased the number of overseas visitors to London from 1.6 million in 1963 to 6 million in 1974. In order to provide hotels to meet the extra demand a Hotel Development Incentive Scheme was introduced and a building boom ensued. This led to overcapacity in the London hotel market from the late 1970s to the mid-1980s. Construction then picked up again, but it was soon curtailed by the recession of the early 1990s and the reduction in international travel caused by the 1991 Gulf War.

The 1980s saw London (along with New York) start the trend of smaller boutique-style hotels. In the mid-1990s, many new hotels were opened, including different types from country-house-style hotels in Victorian houses to ultra-trendy minimalist premises. At this time, some of London's grandest early-20th-century office buildings were converted into hotels because their layouts, with long corridors and numerous separate offices, were incompatible with the preference for open-plan working, but their listed status made it hard to get permission to demolish them. This period also saw the opening of the first five-star hotel in London south of the River Thames, the Marriott County Hall Hotel, and the first two in East London, the Four Seasons Canary Wharf and the Marriott West India Quay, which is also close to the Canary Wharf development. For many years, there were no hotels at all in the City of London, even though the financial firms of the City were one of the London hotel sector's most lucrative sources of custom. But in recent years, over a thousand hotel rooms have opened in the City. Budget hotel chains such as Travel Inn and Travelodge have also been expanding rapidly in London, since the mid-1990s.

One of the most expensive hotels in London is The Lanesborough. Originally a private address (Lanesborough House), in 1733 it was converted into St George's Hospital, and began life as a hotel in 1991.

Hotels in modern London

There is no official registry of hotel rooms in London, but the estimated number of hotel rooms in Greater London in 2010 was put at 123,000. According to figures produced in support of London's 2012 Olympic bid, there were more than 70,000 three to five-star hotel rooms within 10 kilometres of Central London in 2003. The main growth was a huge rise in the number of rooms within the City of London, while Kensington and Chelsea actually had a small fall. This is comparing figures since 1981.
The main concentration of luxury hotels is in the West End, especially in Mayfair and Soho. London's five star hotels are quite small on average by international standards. The largest, Grosvenor House Hotel, has only 494 rooms, and eighteen of them have fifty or fewer. The range is very wide, including:
 Traditional purpose-built grand hotels such as the Ritz, the Savoy, and the Dorchester.
 Recent conversions of grand late 19th and early 20th-century office buildings into hotels such as One Aldwych and the Renaissance Chancery Court.
 Townhouse hotels.
 Modern purpose-built chain hotels.

List of Five-Star Hotels in London
There are no official bodies that rate hotels. The most widely accepted bodies are the AA (in the past the RAC too) and the English Tourist Board. The ETB has recently changed its criteria to match that of the AA, to provide consistency. Many hotels remain self-rated.

Other notable hotels
 One of the more unusual hotels is the Sunborn London, a floating hotel by the Excel center in East London and constructed specifically as a stationary floating hotel (it has no engine).  The original yacht was sold to the Lagos government and has now been replaced with a larger yacht at the same berth.
 The 3-star 1,630-bedroom Royal National Hotel in Bloomsbury is the largest hotel in the United Kingdom by the number of rooms, with 1,271.
 The Hilton London Metropole Hotel in Paddington is the largest 4-star hotel in London and the United Kingdom. It has 1,058 bedrooms and extensive conference facilities.
 The Guoman Tower Hotel (formerly Thistle) near Tower Bridge is one of the largest hotels in London with over 800 bedrooms, and is regarded by some as one of the ugliest - it was twice voted the second ugliest building in London, in a 2005 Time Out poll, and in a 2006 BBC poll - and most insensitively located brutalist buildings in the city. However, others find its location by St Katharine Docks and the Tower of London as quite relaxing and scenic.
 The Regent Palace Hotel, which was located on the northern side of Piccadilly Circus, closed in December 2006. Notable as having been Europe's largest hotel in terms of room numbers (1028) when it opened on May 16, 1915.
 World's largest floating hotel will arrive in London in 2012.

Events
After the 2006 transatlantic aircraft plot London hotels showed a drop in average room rate growth and occupancy growth. However, this was not as steep as might have been expected since figures were compared to the previous year's figures which were themselves affected by the July 7th London bombings of 2005. It is thought without those circumstances the real drop would have been something in the region of 20-30%. Strangely while figures showed a drop in bookings some major chains such as Intercontinental reported strong demand for hotel rooms in London as passengers became stranded in London unable to get a flight.

In November 2006, several hotels were subject to checks for radiation after former Russian spy Alexander Litvinenko was poisoned with Polonium-210. Most seriously affected was the Millennium Mayfair where 7 members of staff were found to be contaminated with low-level radiation.

November 2006 was also the month Dhiren Barot was sentenced by a British court to serve at least 40 years in prison for planning to cause explosions in London Hotels amongst a list of targets which also included the New York Stock Exchange and the World Bank.

January 2007 saw the first use anywhere in the world of Cryonite technology  to kill bed bugs (freezes pests using a patented carbon dioxide snow) at a top London Hotel (unnamed).

In February 2010, a murder took place in the Landmark Hotel, one of the most expensive hotels in London.

November 2014, a gas explosion caused 14 injuries at the luxury Hyatt Regency Churchill Hotel

Facts
In March 2007 Westminster council released reports saying some of London's best known hotels had been considered a “serious danger to health” by environmental inspectors in previous years. The hotels were the Savoy, the Halkin, the Langham and the Dorchester. The Langham received confirmation from Westminster Council that "everything was in good order" in May 2006, and the Dorchester disinfected their air conditioning system in response to legionella bacteria found in bedrooms.

In March 2011, London Hotels were the 8th most expensive in the world.

In February 2015 London was said to be the most expensive city in Europe for hotel rooms judged by advertised rates.

See also
 Lists of hotels – an index of hotel list articles on Wikipedia

References

 
London